The Jerusalem cross (also known as "five-fold Cross", or "cross-and-crosslets") is a heraldic cross and Christian cross variant consisting of a large cross potent  surrounded by four smaller Greek crosses, one in each quadrant. It was used as the emblem and coat of arms of the Kingdom of Jerusalem from the 1280s.

There are variants to the design, also known as "Jerusalem cross", with either the four crosslets also in the form of Crosses potent, or conversely with the central cross, also in the form of a plain Greek cross. It is not to be confused with the Lorraine cross, which has also been called the "Jerusalem cross".

Origins

While the symbol of the five-fold cross appears to originate in the 11th century, its association with the Kingdom of Jerusalem dates to the second half of the 13th century.

The symbolism of the five-fold cross is variously given as the Five Wounds of Christ, Christ and the four evangelists, or Christ and the four quarters of the world. The symbolism of five crosses representing the Five Wounds is first recorded in the context of the consecration of the St Brelade's Church under the patronage of Robert of Normandy (before 1035); the crosses are incised in the church's altar stone.

The "cross-and-crosslets" or Tealby pennies minted under Henry II of England during 1158–1180 have the "Jerusalem cross" on the obverse, with the four crosslets depicted as decussate (diagonal). Similar cross designs on the obverse of coins go back to at least the Anglo-Saxon period.

As the arms of the Kingdom of Jerusalem, the design is traditionally attributed to Godfrey of Bouillon himself. It was not used, however, by the Christian rulers of Jerusalem during the 12th century.
A simple blazon of or, a cross argent is documented by Matthew Paris as the arms of John de Brienne, who had been king of Jerusalem during 1210–1212, upon John's death in 1237.

The emblem used on the seals of the rulers of Jerusalem during the 12th century was a simplified depiction of the city itself, showing the tower of David  between the Dome of the Rock and the Holy Sepulchre, surrounded by the city walls. Coins minted under Henry I (r. 1192–1197) show a cross with four dots in the four quarters, but the Jerusalem cross proper appears only on a coin minted under John II (r. 1284/5).

At about the same time, the cross of Jerusalem in gold on a silver field appears as the coat of arms of the Kingdom of Jerusalem in early armorials such as the Camden Roll. The arms of the King of Jerusalem featured gold on silver (in the case of John de Brienne, silver on gold), a metal on a metal, and thus broke the heraldic Rule of Tincture; this was justified by the fact that Jerusalem was so holy, it was above ordinary rules. The gold and silver were also connected to Psalms 68:13, which mentions a "dove covered in silver, and her feathers with yellow gold".

The Gelre Armorial (14th century) attributes to the "emperors of Constantinople" (the Latin Empire) a variant of the Jerusalem cross with the four crosslets inscribed in circles. Philip of Courtenay, who held the title of Latin Emperor of Constantinople from 1273–1283 (even though Constantinople had been reconquered by the Byzantine Empire in 1261) used an extended form of the Jerusalem cross,  where each of the four crosslets was itself surrounded by four smaller crosslets (a "Jerusalem cross of Jerusalem crosses").

Classical heraldry
In late medieval heraldry the Crusader's cross was used for various Crusader states. The 14th-century Book of All Kingdoms uses it as the flag of Sebasteia. At about the same time, the Pizzigano chart uses it as the flag of Tbilisi (based on the latter example, the Crusader's cross was adopted as the flag of Georgia in 2004).

Carlo Maggi, a Venetian nobleman who visited Jerusalem and was made a knight of the Order of the Holy Sepulchre in the early 1570s, included the Jerusalem cross in his coat of arms.

There is a historiographical tradition that Peter the Great flew a flag with a variant of the Jerusalem cross in his campaign in the White Sea in 1693.

Modern use
A banner with a variation of the Jerusalem cross was used at the proclamation of the Revolution on Mount Pelion Anthimos Gazis in May 1821 in the Greek War of Independence.

The papal Order of the Holy Sepulchre uses the Jerusalem cross as its emblem, in red, which is also used in the arms of the Custodian of the Holy Land, head of the Franciscan friars who serve at the holy Christian sites in Jerusalem, and whose work is supported by the Order. 

When Albert, Prince of Wales (later King Edward VII), visited Jerusalem in 1862, he had a Jerusalem cross tattooed on his arm. German Emperor Wilhelm II visited Jerusalem in 1898 and awarded the Jerusalem-Erinnerungskreuz (Jerusalem Memorial Cross) order in the shape of a Jerusalem cross to those who accompanied him at the inauguration of the Lutheran Church of the Redeemer, Jerusalem.

In the early 20th century, the Jerusalem cross also came to be used as a symbol of world evangelisation in Protestantism. A derived design known as the "Episcopal Church Service Cross" was first used during World War I by the Anglican Episcopal Church in the United States. The Jerusalem cross was chosen as the emblem of the Deutscher Evangelischer Kirchentag (German Evangelical Church Congress) in the 1950s, since the 1960s shown in a simplified form where the central Cross potent is replaced by a simple Greek cross.

The modern Flag of Georgia was introduced in 2004 on the basis of the flag of Tbilisi shown in the Pizzigano chart.

The Jerusalem Cross is also the symbol of Kairos, a four day Jesuit retreat that is held for youth in high schools and parishes around the world. The four crosses are used to symbolize the motto of the retreat "Live the fourth".

The Unicode character set has a character ☩, U+2629 CROSS OF JERUSALEM in the Miscellaneous Symbols table. However, the glyph associated with that character according to the official Unicode character sheet is shown as a simple cross potent, and not a Jerusalem cross.

Frequency selective surfaces 
The Jerusalem cross is often used in frequency selective surface application. The Jerusalem cross is an attractive choice for the periodic element because such a choice makes the frequency selective surface less sensitive to angle of incidence.

See also
 Jerusalem cube

References

External links

Jerusalem Civil Ensign

11th-century introductions
Christian crosses
Crosses in heraldry
Kingdom of Jerusalem